The Macchi M.14 was an Italian fighter of 1918 designed and manufactured by Macchi. The M.14 was the first non-seaplane fighter Macchi produced, its previous fighter production having focused on flying boat fighters.

Design and development

Alessandro Tonini designed the M.14, which was a single-seat wooden sesquiplane with Warren truss interplane bracing and armed with two fixed, forward-firing 7.7-millimeter (0.303-inch) Vickers machine guns synchronized to fire through the propeller. It had fixed, tailskid landing gear, and its 82-kilowatt (110-horsepower) Le Rhône 9J nine-cylinder rotary engine drove a two-bladed tractor propeller.

Operational history
Company testing of the M.14 prototype began in the spring of 1918. It was destroyed in June 1918, but Macchi then constructed 10 production aircraft, which underwent official evaluation at Guidonia Montecelio in 1919. Although no additional M.14s were ordered, the 10 aircraft saw service as advanced trainers. At least one of them is known to have become a civilian aircraft with the civil registration I-BADG.

Operators

 Corpo Aeronautico Militare

Specifications

See also

References

1910s Italian fighter aircraft
M.14
Sesquiplanes
Aircraft first flown in 1918